Grace Sydney Vaughan (née Ingram; 1 April 1922 – 21 January 1984) was an Australian politician who was a Labor Party member of the Legislative Council of Western Australia from 1974 to 1980. Prior to entering politics, she was a social worker, holding degrees from the University of New South Wales and the University of Western Australia. Vaughan entered parliament at the 1974 state election, and served a single six-year term before being defeated at the 1980 election. Before she and Margaret McAleer were elected in 1974, only two other women had ever served in the Legislative Council (Ruby Hutchison and Lyla Elliott). After leaving parliament, Vaughan served as president of the International Federation of Social Workers from 1983 to her death in 1984.

See also
 Women in the Western Australian Legislative Council

References

1922 births
1984 deaths
Australian Labor Party members of the Parliament of Western Australia
Members of the Western Australian Legislative Council
Politicians from Sydney
20th-century Australian politicians
20th-century Australian women politicians
Women members of the Western Australian Legislative Council